The Derry county football team represents Derry GAA, the county board of the Gaelic Athletic Association, in the Gaelic sport of football. The team competes in the three major annual inter-county competitions; the All-Ireland Senior Football Championship, the Ulster Senior Football Championship and the National Football League.

Derry's home ground is Celtic Park. The team's manager is Rory Gallagher.

The team last won the Ulster Senior Championship in 2022, the All-Ireland Senior Championship in 1993 and the National League in 2008.

The team is nicknamed the Oak Leafers.

History

In 1947, Derry won the National Football League. The group leaders were invited to play in the League semi-finals because heavy snow had disrupted the competition. Francie Niblock scored one of the finest goals in League history in Croke Park as Derry beat Clare. In 1958, the county won its first Ulster Senior Football Championship (SFC) and secured a surprise victory in that year's All-Ireland semi-final, beating Kerry thanks to a Sean O'Connell goal three minutes from the end. In the final, Derry scored a goal ten minutes into the second half through Owen Gribben, but Dublin secured victory with goals scored by Paddy Farnan and Johnny Joyce.

In 1965, the Derry minor team won the All-Ireland Minor Championship, and three years later, at under-21 level, the bulk of that team captured the All-Ireland Under 21 Championship. Derry won the Ulster Senior Championship three times in the 1970s (1970, 1975 and 1976), but failed to advance past the All-Ireland semi-final stage on each occasion. In 1973, Anthony McGurk became the first player from Derry to receive an All Star Award.

The 1980s saw the county win two further All-Ireland Minor Championships (1983 and 1989) and their fifth Ulster Senior Championship (1987).

The 1990s proved to be the county's most successful decade. They won the county's second National League title in 1992, before winning the Ulster Championship and a first All-Ireland Senior Football Championship in 1993. Derry won back-to-back National Leagues in 1995 and 1996, and the under-21 team won the 1997 All-Ireland Under-21 Championship. In 1998, Derry won another Ulster Senior Championship. In 2008, the Derry side of the 1990s was rated as one of the best of the previous twenty years and would have achieved more were it not for several unexpected defeats such as to Down in 1994, Tyrone in 1995 and Cavan in 1997.

Derry won the 2000 National League and the county's minor team won their fourth All-Ireland Minor Championship in 2002. Derry won the 2008 National League, their sixth in all. Since then they have been overshadowed in the Ulster Senior Championship by the emergence of Tyrone and Donegal. Derry topped Division 2 of the NFL in 2013 and returned to Division 1 for the 2014 season.

Manager Damian Barton was banned after involving himself in an on-field fight in 2016.

Derry were relegated to Division 4 in 2018.

Joe Brolly wrote in August 2020 that Derry seriously debate whether to field a team in the Senior Football Championship as their presence in league and championship has been similar to that of Kilkenny, who concentrate on hurling instead. Derry won the 2022 Ulster SFC, for the first time in 24 years, and progressed to a 2022 All-Ireland SFC semi-final for the first time in donkey's years. So much for Joe Brolly.

Current panel

Managerial history

Players

Notable players

Records
In 1993, Dermot McNicholl became the first former AFL player to win the Sam Maguire Cup. He was the last former AFL player from Ulster to do so until Conor McKenna won the 2021 All-Ireland Senior Football Championship Final with Tyrone.

Cú Chulainn Awards
Since the 1960s there has been a tradition of annually selecting the best footballer in each position, to create a special team of the year. Between 1963 and 1967 these players received what were known as Cú Chulainn awards. Derry received one Cú Chulainn Award.

1967: Sean O'Connell

All Stars
In 1971 the Cú Chulainn Awards were formalised into the annual All Stars Awards.

Footballer of the Year
Two Derry players have been awarded the Texaco Footballer of the Year award. Ballymaguigan's Jim McKeever won the inaugural award in 1958, while Henry Downey of the Lavey club received player of the year for his performances in helping Derry win the 1993 All-Ireland Senior Football Championship.

1958: Jim McKeever
1993: Henry Downey

GPA Gaelic Football Team of the Year
From 2006 onwards, the Gaelic Players Association chose its own team of the year.

2007: Paddy Bradley

International rules representatives
A number of Derry players have been selected to play international rules football for the Ireland team against Australia; both in the test games (1984, 1986, 1987 and 1990) and since the commencement of the International Rules Series in 1998. Note that the table is incomplete.

Player statistics

Championship

Championship top scorers
End of 2019 Championship 
100+ Points Total

Championship appearances
End of 2019 Championship 
50+ Appearances

Championship single score
End of 2019 Championship 
10+ Points Total

Championship season score
End of 2019 Championship 
30+ Points Total

National League

NFL top scorers
End of 2019 National League
100+ Points Total

NFL appearances
End of 2019 NFL
80+ Appearances

NFL single score
End of 2019 League
10+ Points Total

NFL season score
End of 2019 National League
50+ Points Total

Current management team
Manager: Rory Gallagher
Selectors:

Honours
Official honours, with additions noted.

For more details on this topic including team line-ups, see here

National
All-Ireland Senior Football Championship
 Winners (1): 1993
 Runners-up (1): 1958
National Football League
 Winners (6): 1946–47, 1991–92, 1994–95, 1995–96, 1999–2000, 2008
 Runners-up (6): 1958–59, 1960–61, 1975–76, 1997–98, 2009, 2014
All-Ireland Under-21 Football Championship
 Winners (2): 1968, 1997
All-Ireland Minor Football Championship
 Winners (5): 1965, 1983, 1989, 2002, 2020
All-Ireland Vocational Schools Championship:
 Winners (3): 1979, 1980, 1981

Provincial
Ulster Senior Football Championship
 Winners (8): 1958, 1970, 1975, 1976, 1987, 1993, 1998, 2022
 Runners-up (10): 1921, 1955, 1957, 1971, 1977, 1985, 1992, 1997, 2000, 2011
Dr McKenna Cup
 Winners (11): 1947, 1954, 1958, 1960, 1969, 1970, 1971, 1974, 1993, 1999, 2011
Dr Lagan Cup
 Winners (5): 1945, 1947, 1950, 1953, 1959,
Ulster Junior Football Championship
 Winners (7): 1945, 1950, 1953, 1955, 1964, 1967, 1969
Ulster Under-21 Football Championship
 Winners (7): 1967, 1968, 1976, 1983, 1986, 1993, 1997
Ulster Minor Football Championship
 Winners (15): 1965, 1969, 1970, 1980, 1981, 1983, 1984, 1989, 1990, 1995, 2000, 2002, 2015, 2017, 2020
Ulster Vocational Schools Championship: ?
?

References

 
County football teams